Cowes is the main township on Phillip Island in the Gippsland region of Victoria, Australia. It is about two hours' drive from Melbourne and can also be reached by coach, or passenger ferry from Stony Point on the Mornington Peninsula. Cowes is located on the northern side of Phillip Island and faces towards French Island and the Mornington Peninsula. At the 2016 census, Cowes had a population of 4,839.

History
The area was originally known as Mussel Rocks. In 1865, a government surveyor Henry Cox returned from a holiday retreat in England and named the town he surveyed after the seaport town of Cowes on the Isle of Wight, England. The Post Office opened on 1 August 1869.

The Cowes Magistrates' Court closed on 1 January 1990.

The town today
In recent years Cowes has seen a rapid expansion in its size. Many estates and apartments have been built in and around the town on what was previously rural farmland. An estimated 70% of houses are owned by absentee owners, most of whom live in and around Melbourne.

The main road of the island (Phillip Island Road) leads into Cowes and becomes the town's main road, Thompson Avenue.  A distinctive feature of the road is the 1 km lining of Golden Cypress trees which were planted in the early 20th century.  Further into town, the road begins a gradual descent before it terminates with a T-intersection at the waterfront.  As the road approaches the waterfront, density of restaurants and general retail outlets increases.  Retailers in Cowes include Coles, Woolworths, Aldi, IGA and Dimmeys.  Cowes Jetty was built at the end of Thompson Avenue in 1870 and remains a focal point of the town.  It is flanked by sheltered beaches which are a popular attraction for families.  An annual fireworks event was held at 9pm on New Year's Eve until in 2010 when they were cancelled and reinstated in 2017. Occasionally a container ship can be seen from the waterfront heading to or from the port at Hastings which is located to the north.

Traffic tends to be heavy and accommodation may be scarce during holiday periods and large events at the Phillip Island Grand Prix Circuit.

Since the 1960s, Cowes has been home to Christian Youth Camps in Church St and have run holiday camps for children, youth and young adults. CYC has since redeveloped another much larger campsite just outside Cowes - the Phillip Island Adventure Resort. After this CYC then also bought campsites at Adanac and Forest Edge.

The town has an Australian Rules football team, Phillip Island, competing in the Alberton Football League.

Golfers play at the course of Phillip Island Golf on Settlement Road.

Phillip Island Nature Park (PINP) is one of the largest conservation parks in Australia. PINP is located on Philip Island, Victoria, Australia. This park was created in 1996 and it is totally owned by the Victoria State Government. PINP is located 1.5 hours’ drive at the south of Melbourne.

This park mainly covers over 1805 hectares. Main attractions in the park are Pyramid Rock, Rhyll Inlet, Seal Rocks, and Cape Woolamai. The park also includes specific viewing and attraction areas such as Nobbies Centre which is mainly for seals, dolphins and shark viewing, the Penguin Parade where one can see penguins coming ashore, Koala Conservation Centre and the Churchill Island Heritage Farm.

References

External links 

Westernport Ferries
Australian Places - Cowes

Phillip Island
Western Port
Towns in Victoria (Australia)
Bass Coast Shire